Grevillea depauperata is a species of flowering plant in the family Proteaceae and is endemic to the south-west of Western Australia. It is a low, dense, spreading shrub with oblong or egg-shaped leaves and clusters of red to orange flowers.

Description
The upper surface of the leaves is glabrous and glossy, the lower surface densely hairy. The flowers are red to orange and woolly hairy on the outside.

Taxonomy
Grevillea depauperata was first formally described in 1830 by Robert Brown in the Supplementum primum prodromi florae Novae Hollandiae from specimens collected by William Baxter near King George Sound in 1829. The specific epithet (depauperata) means "reduced", referring to the habit of the plant.

Distribution and habitat
Grevillea depauperata grows in woodland between Albany, Cranbrook and Manjimup in the Esperance Plains and Jarrah Forest biogeographic regions of south-western Western Australia.

Conservation status
This grevillea is listed as "not threatened" by the Department of Biodiversity, Conservation and Attractions.

References

Eudicots of Western Australia
depauperata
Plants described in 1830
Taxa named by Robert Brown (botanist, born 1773)